Santos Vega Returns (Spanish:Santos Vega vuelve) is a 1947 Argentine historical adventure film directed by Leopoldo Torres Ríos and starring Juan José Miguez, Delfy de Ortega and Pedro Maratea. It is based on the story of Santos Vega.

Cast
 Juan José Miguez as Santos Vega  
 Delfy de Ortega as La Prienda  
 Pedro Maratea as Juan Sin Ropa  
 Eloísa Cañizares
 Enrique García Satur 
 Pascual Nacarati 
 Maruja Roig 
 Isabel Figlioli 
 Antonio Capuano 
 Irma Denás
 Jorge Ayala 
 Juan Pérez Bilbao

References

Bibliography 
 Tad Bentley Hammer. International film prizes: an encyclopedia. Garland, 1991.

External links 
 

1947 films
Argentine historical films
1940s historical films
1940s Spanish-language films
Films directed by Leopoldo Torres Ríos
Argentine black-and-white films
1940s Argentine films